WEUR (1490 AM) is a time-brokered radio station licensed to Oak Park, Illinois, United States, the station serves the Chicago metropolitan area. The station is currently owned by Daniela Wojcik, through licensee CSWWII, LLC.

Programming
The majority of the station's programming is Polish language news, talk, and sports. They feature polka music on the weekends with the long running Eddie Blazonczyk Polka Show hosted by Tish Blazonczyk,

WEUR is the home of the Hagerty Family Irish Program, the longest running Irish program in the United States. This program has been on the station every Saturday morning since 1951.

History

The station began broadcasting October 7, 1950. The station's call sign was originally WEBS, but before going on the air the call sign was changed to WOPA to reflect the location of its studios. The studios and antenna were in the former Oak Park Arms Hotel, now a retirement community.

Pervis Spann began his radio career on WOPA in 1959.

In 1984, the station's call sign was changed to WBMX.

In January of 1987, the station was sold to the Polish National Alliance for $2 million, and its call sign was changed to WPNA on May 1, 1987. WPNA was the home of the long-running Chet Gulinski Show, which featured polka music and was quite popular in Chicago's Eastern European communities.

On May 25, 2022, the Polish National Alliance announced the sale of WPNA 1490AM to Daniela Wojcik's CSWWII, LLC for $725,000. The sale was consummated on August 1, 2022. Alliance Communications, which operates Polish CHR WPNA-FM 103.1FM in Highland Park, IL retained the rights to the WPNA call letters & intellectual property. The station changed its call sign to WEUR on August 31, 2022.

References

External links
 WEUR Official Website
 Hagerty Family Irish Program Website
 International Polka Association Website

Polish-language radio stations in the United States
EUR
Radio stations established in 1950
1950 establishments in Illinois